Justice Hettikankanange Nalin Jayalath Perera (born 29 April 1954) is a Sri Lanka judge who served as the 46th Chief Justice of Sri Lanka.

Education and early career
Educated at St. Thomas' College, Kotte and S. Thomas' College, Gurutalawa, he studied law at the Sri Lanka Law College, passing out in 1977. His contemporaries included Mahinda Rajapaksa and Jeyaraj Fernandopulle. Having taken oaths as an attorney-at-law, he worked under Daya Perera.

Judicial career

Lower courts
Perera served as a Primary Court judge from 1980, in Embilipitiya and Welimada. In 1984, he was appointed as a Magistrate. He functioned as the Magistrate of Mount-Lavinia, Walasmulla, Kalutara and Colombo Fort. He became a District Judge in 1990.

High court
In 2001 he was appointed a High Court Judge and served in Ratnapura, Kandy and Nuwara Eliya. He served as a Criminal High Court judge and became one of the first High Court Judges appointed to the newly formed Civil Appellate High Courts in Kandy. While High Court Judge of Ratnapura, he presided over the trail of the murder of Padmasiri Thrimavitharana.

Appeal court
In 2011, he was appointed as a Justice of the Court of Appeal by President Mahinda Rajapaksa and Jeyaraj Fernandopulle served until 2016.

Supreme court
He was appointed by President Maithripala Sirisena as a Justice of the Supreme Court in March 2016 to replace Justice Sarath de Abrew on his retirement. In October 2018, he was nominated by President Maithripala Sirisena to the Constitutional Council for post of Chief Justice on the retirement of Justice Priyasath Dep. Following the approval of the Constitutional Council, he took oaths as the 46th Chief Justice of Sri Lanka on 12 October. After serving six months in office Perera retired upon reaching the age of 65. A ceremonial farewell was held by the Supreme Court on 5 April. Perera's  successor, Attorney General Jayantha Jayasuriya was approved by the Constitutional Council on the 26 April.

Family
He is married to Shirani Perera, who is a lawyer. His sister was Justice Sherin Madawala, former Court of Appeal Judge. He and his sister was the first brother and sister to serve in the Court of Appeal.

References

20th-century Sri Lankan people
21st-century Sri Lankan people
Alumni of Sri Lanka Law College
Chief justices of Sri Lanka
Court of Appeal of Sri Lanka judges
High Courts of Sri Lanka judges
Living people
Puisne Justices of the Supreme Court of Sri Lanka
Sinhalese judges
Sinhalese lawyers
1954 births